Carolina Papaleo (b. Buenos Aires, 19 January 1969) is an Argentine actress of theater, film and television. She is the daughter of the actress Irma Roy and the journalist Osvaldo Papaleo. From a very young age she wanted to be an actress like her mother. In 2013 she debuted as a television presenter on a Channel 9 program Secretos de novelas which reviews telenovelas. She is a fan of the genre and watches four episodes a week to be able to review them. Papaleo is recognized and remembered for her role as Ana Oromi in the hit telenovela Una voz en el teléfono, which first brought her fame.

Filmography

Films
 Después de ayer (1987)
 La amiga (1988)
 Misión comando (1989)
 Siempre es difícil volver a casa (1992)
 Perdido por perdido (1993)
 Besos en la frente (1996)
 El mundo contra mí (1996)
 La maestra normal (1996)
 El evangelio de las maravillas (1998)
 Tres veranos (1999)
 Ni tan lejos, ni tan cerca (2005)
 Chile 672 (2006)

Television
 Ficciones (1987)
 Pasiones (1988)
 Vínculos I, II, III (1988-1989-1990)
 Ella contra mí (1989)
 Una voz en el teléfono (1991)
 Zona de riesgo (1992)
 Esos que dicen amarse (1993)
 Cara bonita (1995)
 Alta comedia (1995)
 Por siempre mujercitas (1996)
 El signo (1997)
 Ricos y famosos (1998)
 Los buscas de siempre (2000)
 PH (2001)
 1000 Millones (2002)
 Infieles (2003)
 Los Roldán (2004)
 Panadería de "Los Felipe" (2004)
 Amor en custodia (2005)
 Doble venganza (2006)
 La ley del amor (2007)
 Maltratadas (2011)
 Adictos (2011)
 Historias de corazón (chapter 1) (2013)
 Secretos de novelas (2013 - 2015)

Live presentations

Radio
 Hora Pico (2011)
 Caro en Radio (2011 - 2012 - 2013)
 El ángel del Mediodia (2012)

Theater
 Noche de Reyes (1991)
 La dueña de la historia (2000 and 2003)
 Parecen Ángeles (2002)
 Cabaret Bijou (2004)
 11… Código para ciegos (2004)
 El Pintor (2004-2005)
 El camino a la Meca (2005-2006–2007)
 Flores de Acero (2007-2008-2009)
 Closer (2009)
 Fortuna (2010)
 Pirañas (2010)
 Mujeres y botellas (2011)
 Yo Adivino el Parpadeo (2011-2012)
 Mi vida con él (2012)
 El organito (2013)
 Los hombres de la independencia (2013)
 Ser Mujer es Caro (2013)
 Sé infiel y no mires con quien (2014)

References

External links 
 
 Nuestros Actores

1969 births
Living people
Actresses from Buenos Aires
Argentine television actresses
Argentine film actresses
Argentine stage actresses
20th-century Argentine actresses
21st-century Argentine actresses